William Glynne Charles Gladstone (14 July 1885 – 13 April 1915) was a Liberal Party politician in the United Kingdom, and the last of four generations of Gladstones to sit in the House of Commons, the first being his great-grandfather Sir John Gladstone (1764–1851). His body was the last to be officially repatriated to the United Kingdom during the First World War.

Early life

Gladstone was born on 14 July 1885. His father, William Henry Gladstone (1840–1891), was the eldest son of the Liberal Prime Minister William Ewart Gladstone and his wife Catherine, and his mother was the Hon. Gertrude Gladstone, daughter of Charles Stuart, 12th Lord Blantyre. He inherited from his father the 18th-century Hawarden Castle which had belonged to the family of his grandmother's brother Sir Stephen Glynne, the 9th and last baronet.

He was educated at home before attending Eton and then New College, Oxford. He was president of the Oxford Union in 1907 and graduated with a second class degree.

Career

Political career

In 1909, Gladstone was the Assistant Private Secretary to John Hamilton-Gordon, Earl of Aberdeen who was serving as Lord Lieutenant of Ireland. In 1911, he worked for a few months at the British Embassy in Washington, D.C., as an honorary attaché to Lord Bryce.

He stood as the Liberal Party candidate in the Kilmarnock Burghs by-election held on 26 September 1911 and was elected as the member of parliament (MP). 
A whip in Asquith's government, he was in Parliament for only 4 years.

Military service

Gladstone was commissioned into the British Army on 15 August 1914 as a second lieutenant (on probation); he had originally wished to enlist as a private but was advised to become an officer. He joined the 3rd Battalion, Royal Welsh Fusiliers and underwent training at Wrexham before going out to France in March 1915. He first came under fire on 23 March. His commission was confirmed and he was promoted to lieutenant on 7 April 1915.

Death

On 13 April 1915, he was killed in action near Laventie, three weeks after arriving in France. He was shot by a sniper. He was initially buried in France, but permission was granted by King George V for his body to be brought back to the United Kingdom. Nine days after his death, his body was disinterred and re-buried in the churchyard of St Deiniol's, Hawarden, Flintshire, Wales. Also commemorated on the gravestone is his cousin William Herbert Gladstone, MC, son of Stephen and Annie Gladstone, killed in action in 1918.

As a memorial, a rood was installed at St Deiniol's, Hawarden and a new theatre and wards at Chester Royal Infirmary. Gladstone is also commemorated on Panel 8 of the Parliamentary War Memorial in Westminster Hall, one of 22 MPs who died during the War to be named on that memorial. Gladstone is one of 19 MPs who fell in the war who are commemorated by heraldic shields in the Commons Chamber. A further act of commemoration came with the unveiling in 1932 of a manuscript-style illuminated book of remembrance for the House of Commons, which includes a short biographical account of the life and death of Gladstone.

After his death, the estate was purchased by an uncle Henry Gladstone, the third son (and seventh child) of William and Catherine. Herbert Gladstone, another uncle, wrote a memoir of him that was published in 1918.

Honours
On 8 July 1911, Gladstone was appointed Lord Lieutenant of Flintshire. This appointment also came with the title of Custos Rotulorum of Flintshire.

Election results

References

External links 

1885 births
1915 deaths
People from Hawarden
British Army personnel of World War I
British military personnel killed in World War I
Burials in Wales
English people of Scottish descent
Royal Welch Fusiliers officers
Scottish Liberal Party MPs
Lord-Lieutenants of Flintshire
Members of the Parliament of the United Kingdom for Scottish constituencies
UK MPs 1910–1918
William Glynne Charles Gladstone
People educated at Eton College
Alumni of New College, Oxford
Presidents of the Oxford Union
Deaths by firearm in France